Karrana (from  karāna, meaning "coast, bank") is a village located in the Northern Governorate, Bahrain. The village is nicknamed the "Green Village" because of the excellence of its green palms and its relative suitability for agriculture. The village is located west of the capital Manama

Population
Karrana is inhabited by 12,000 people, and is home to the Karrana Elementary School For Girls. Historically, Karrana was divided into a group of villages which were: Al Muqaysim, Rozkan, Al Harbadiya, Al Majrafat, but now is considered to be one village. Some of the distinct areas of the consolidated village include Al Mahmoodiyat, Fareeq Al Manai, Fareeq Al Loza, and others.

Notable people from the village
Abduladhim Al Muhtadi Al Bahrani says in his book Ulama Al Bahrain Durus Wa Ibar (Arabic: علماء البحرين دروس و عبر) page 111 that a skilled author and scientist named Sayyid Abdullah Al Qarooni, who wrote Sharh Al Mughni, was from the village. However, little is known of Sayyid Abdullah Al Qarooni aside from what was noted by Al Bahrani's book and another book called Anwar Al Badrain. It is not known when Sayyid Abdullah died, but it is sometime in 1000 hijri.

Religious figures
Alama Abduladhim Al Muhtadi Al Bahrani
Sheikh Mirza Hussain Ali Abbas Al Aswad
Sayyid Makki Sayyid Hilal Al Wadai

Businessmen
Hajji Isa Hamza Abbas Al Aswad

References

External links
 Karrana.net - Photo Gallery
 - Karrana forum

Populated places in the Northern Governorate, Bahrain